The Maine Mariners were a professional ice hockey team in the American Hockey League. They played in Portland, Maine, at the Cumberland County Civic Center.

History

First franchise
Once the Cumberland County Civic Center began construction in 1976, there was discussion of the building hosting a minor league hockey franchise. Three franchises eventually made bids to play hockey in Portland: the WHA's Quebec Nordiques, the American Hockey League's Providence Reds, and the Philadelphia Flyers from the National Hockey League. Quebec, who had already a farm team in nearby Lewiston (the Maine Nordiques of the North American Hockey League), was considering supporting affiliates in Portland as well.  Rhode Island, who were an established AHL franchise, didn't want to relocate to Portland, but instead proposed scheduling a dozen regular season games there. Philadelphia was the only franchise that wanted to utilize Portland as their team's sole top-level farm club, and in 1977, the agreement to create the Maine Mariners was struck. It proved to be bad news for the Maine Nordiques, who ceased operations after the 1977 season.

Bob McCammon was the team's first head coach. The first regular season game in franchise history was played in Portland in front of 6,566 spectators on October 15, 1977 against the Binghamton Dusters.

The Mariners are the only franchise in league history to win the Calder Cup title in their first two seasons (1977–78, 1978–79) and at the time were the only team to ever capture the Calder Cup during their inaugural season. Later, the feat was matched by the team that brought AHL hockey back to Portland, the Portland Pirates.

Maine returned to the Calder Cup final in 1980–81 and first-year goaltender Pelle Lindbergh became the only goaltender in AHL history, and just the third player ever, to win the AHL regular season MVP and AHL outstanding rookie award in the same season. Bob McCammon won his second AHL coach of the year award.

In 1983–1984, the Flyers sold the Mariners to the New Jersey Devils of the NHL. However, it kept the Flyers' colors of orange, black and white rather than switch to the Devils' black, red and green.  The same season Maine became only the fourth team in AHL history to win a Calder Cup title with a losing regular season record. The Mariners defeated the Rochester Americans in a rematch of the previous year’s finals four games to one. It was the local’s third Calder Cup crown and their fifth finals appearance in seven years. Maine’s championship year was truly a team effort as no members of the club made the all-star team, won a league award during the regular season, or placed in the regular season top ten in scoring. Bud Stefanski was the first recipient of the new AHL playoff MVP award.

Second franchise
Following the 1986–87 season, the original Mariners franchise was moved to Utica, New York as the Utica Devils. However, Portland was not without hockey, as the league approved an expansion team supplied by players from the Boston Bruins. The expansion team assumed the Mariners name and history and took on the Bruins' black-gold-white scheme. After five seasons in Portland, the Mariners franchise was moved to Providence, Rhode Island following the 1991–92 season and renamed the Providence Bruins. The final Mariners home game took place on April 4, 1992 against the Fredericton Canadiens.

Portland was not without AHL hockey for long; a season later, the Portland Pirates arrived and played in Portland until 2016 when the franchise was relocated to become the Springfield Thunderbirds. 

This market has also been served by:
 Maine Nordiques (NAHL) (1973–1977)
 Portland Pirates (1993–2016)
 Maine Mariners (ECHL) (2018–present)

Season-by-season results

Regular season

Playoffs

† Two game combined total goals series.

Notable players
 Brian Burke - 2006-07 Stanley Cup Champion while General Manager of the Anaheim Ducks.
 Pete Peeters - Went on to play 491 NHL games and won the Vezina Trophy for the 1982-83 season.
 Ken Linseman - Went on to play 860 NHL games, 1983-84 Stanley Cup Winner with the Edmonton Oilers.
 Alain Vigneault - Longtime NHL head coach. Won the Jack Adams Award as coach of the year with the Vancouver Canucks in 2006-07.
 Ken Daneyko - Three-time Stanley Cup champion, 2000 Bill Masterton Trophy winner, 1,283 NHL games played with the New Jersey Devils

References

External links
The Internet Hockey Database - Maine Mariners

 
Ice hockey teams in Maine
Defunct American Hockey League teams
Ice hockey clubs established in 1977
Sports clubs disestablished in 1992
Philadelphia Flyers minor league affiliates
New Jersey Devils minor league affiliates
Boston Bruins minor league affiliates
1977 establishments in Maine
1992 disestablishments in Maine
Ice hockey in Portland, Maine